This article lists political parties in the Gambia. The Gambia has multiparty political system but been a one party dominant state in most of the last 25 years with the Alliance for Patriotic Reorientation and Construction in power until December 2016 when it lost to a coalition of 7 opposition parties that ushered in the third republic.

The parties

Parliamentary parties

Other parties
 All Peoples Party (APP)
 Alliance for National Re-orientation and Development (ANRD)
 Citizens’ Alliance (CA)
 Gambia Action Party (GAP)
 Gambia Democratic Congress (GDC)
 Gambia For All (GFA)
 Gambia Moral Congress (GMC)
 Gambia Party for Democracy and Progress (GPDP)
 National Convention Party (NCP)
 National People's Party (NPP)
 People's Progressive Party (PPP)

Possible defunct parties
 National Alliance for Democracy and Development
 National Democratic Action Movement
 Gambia Socialist Revolutionary Party (GSRP)
 Gambian People's Party (GPP)

See also

 List of political parties by country

Gambia
 
Political parties
Political parties
Gambia